Hakki Akdeniz  is a Kurdish restaurateur and pizza chef. He is owner and founder of the pizzeria chain Champion Pizza in New York City.

Biography 

In 1997, Hakki moved to Montreal, Canada and worked at his brother’s pizzeria. He moved to New York in 2001 and started working at a pizzeria until 2005. In 2009, he founded his first pizza shop in the lower east side of Manhattan, which was later named Champion Pizza. Soon later, he was featured in a cover article in PMQ Pizza Magazine with thousands of copies in print. As a pizza chef, he is known for his flashy acrobatics in tossing and twirling dough, flaming or otherwise and for building giant pizzas. Akdeniz received media attention by his charity works in support of homeless.

Awards and honors
He received a total of 12 awards. In 2019, he received the Beacon Award from The American Immigrant Society.
In February 2022, he gave a TED talk at Rutgers University titled Homeless Not Hopeless; it has received over 1.3 million views as of August 2022.

References

External links
Official Website

American restaurateurs
American chefs
Living people
Year of birth missing (living people)